Tongwadian, also known as Jinding Temple, is a Buddhist temple located on Mount Jizu, in Dali Prefecture, Yunnan, China.

History
The temple was originally built in the Zhengtong period (1436–1449) of the Ming dynasty (1368–1644). Because it located on the top of Mount Jizu, it also known as Gold Summit Temple.

During the Second Sino-Japanese War, the Śūraṅgama Pagoda was used as the navigation mark of The Hump.

In 1966, Mao Zedong launched the ten-year Cultural Revolution, the temple was completely destroyed in this massive movement, only the main hall and Śūraṅgama Pagoda survived.

It was inscribed to the National Key Buddhist Temple in Han Chinese Area List in 1983.

A modern restoration of the entire temple complex was carried out in 2000 under the leadership of Shi Weisheng.

Architecture
The existing main buildings include the Shanmen, Four Heavenly Kings Hall, Mahavira Hall, Bell tower, Drum tower, Buddhist Texts Library, and Śūraṅgama Pagoda.

Śūraṅgama Pagoda
Its name is derived from Śūraṅgama Sūtra.

References

Bibliography
 

Buddhist temples in Yunnan
Buildings and structures in Dali Bai Autonomous Prefecture
Tourist attractions in Dali Bai Autonomous Prefecture
15th-century establishments in China
15th-century Buddhist temples